Another Spring is a 1950 Mexican drama film directed by Alfredo B. Crevenna and starring Libertad Lamarque and Ernesto Alonso.

The film is one of five productions that Lamarque made with Crevenna, the others being La dama del velo (1949), Huellas del pasado (1950), La mujer sin lágrimas (1951), y Si volvieras a mí (1954).

Plot
Arturo (Ernesto Alonso), after becoming a widower, thinks that at last he will be able to spend his life with Amelia (Libertad Lamarque), his mistress and the woman he always loved, and recognize the children they had together. Amelia, however, fears that people will start talking badly about her and especially that her children will question her. For her part, Arturo's daughter is upset with the arrival of Amelia and her children and promises to make their lives impossible, while doubts about the circumstances of the death of Arturo's previous wife remain.

Cast
Libertad Lamarque as Amelia
Ernesto Alonso as Arturo Montesinos
Patricia Morán as Cristina
Alberto Galán as Javier
Alicia Grau as Adult Marta
Carlos Navarro as Adult Raúl
Héctor López Portillo as Eugenio
Carlos Martínez Baena as Amelia's father
María Gentil Arcos as Faustina, maid
Paco Martínez as Dionisio, butler (as Francisco Martínez)
Azucena Rodríguez as Child Marta
Luis Rodríguez as Child Raúl
Daniel Arroyo as Party guest (uncredited)
Ricardo Avendaño as Man in funeral (uncredited)
Victorio Blanco as Wedding guest (uncredited)
Jorge Chesterking as Party guest (uncredited)
Irma Dorantes as Party guest (uncredited)
Enedina Díaz de León as Maid (uncredited)
José Luis Fernández as Man among crowd (uncredited)
Lidia Franco as Doña María del Carmen (uncredited)
Ana María Hernández as Party guest (uncredited)
Velia Lupercio as Guest at reception (uncredited)
Concepción Martínez as Wedding guest (uncredited)
Álvaro Matute as Police officer (uncredited)
Rubén Márquez as Party guest (uncredited)
Ignacio Peón as Feliciano (uncredited)
Juan Pulido as Council president (uncredited)
María Valdealde as Party guest (uncredited)

References

External links

1950 drama films
1950 films
Mexican drama films
Films directed by Alfredo B. Crevenna
Films scored by Manuel Esperón
Mexican black-and-white films
1950s Spanish-language films
1950s Mexican films